USS LST-964 was an  in the United States Navy. Like many of her class, she was not named and is properly referred to by her hull designation.

Construction
LST-964 was laid down on 24 October 1944, at Hingham, Massachusetts, by the Bethlehem-Hingham Shipyard; launched on 22 November 1944; sponsored by Mrs. Ailene Borland; and commissioned on 16 December 1944.

Service history
Following the war, she performed occupation duty in the Far East and saw service in China until early April 1946. She returned to the United States and was decommissioned on 27 June 1946, and struck from the Navy list on 15 August, that same year. On 17 January 1947, the ship was sold to Campania Naviera y Commercial Perez Compano S.A. for operation.

She was later sold to the Carrier Company and renamed Ionian Sea. In 1974, she was again sold, to Dalmine Deguara Siderca Company at Campana, Brazil, on the Paraná River.

Notes

Citations

Bibliography 

Online resources

External links
 

 

LST-542-class tank landing ships
World War II amphibious warfare vessels of the United States
Ships built in Hingham, Massachusetts
1944 ships